Barda is the name of several rural localities in Russia:
Barda, Irkutsk Oblast, a village in Ekhirit-Bulagatsky District of Irkutsk Oblast
Barda, Perm Krai, a selo in Bardymsky District of Perm Krai